Alexis Collera Castro (born September 27, 1985), better known as Alex Castro, is a Filipino model, singer, actor and politician currently serving as the Vice Governor of Bulacan since 2022. He is previously a member of the Bulacan Provincial Board from the 4th district from 2016 to 2022. He also served as a municipal councilor of Marilao from 2007 to 2013 and chairman of Sangguniang Kabataan in Barangay Lias, Marilao from 2002 to 2007. As a talent, he signed with GMA Network, yet later transferred to its rival network ABS-CBN, then returned to GMA after eleven years.

Early life
Alexis Collera Castro was born on September 27, 1985 in Quezon City. His family moved to Marilao during his childhood.

Political career
In 2002, at age 17, Castro was elected Sangguniang Kabataan (SK) chairman of Barangay Lias, Marilao, Bulacan. Not long after, he was elected as the SK Federation president of Marilao, making him an ex-officio member of the Sangguniang Bayan of Marilao. He was awarded as the “Most Outstanding SK Federation President” in the Gintong Kabataan Awards in 2005. While fulfilling his duties, he obtained his Bachelor of Science in Mass Communication degree from the Far Eastern University in 2006.

In 2007, he was eventually elected as the youngest municipal councilor of Marilao. He was re-elected in 2010, the same year that he was conferred as 2010 Gawad Galing Sanggunian's “Outstanding Councilor in Bulacan”. Two years later, he was again recognized as “Outstanding Councilor in the Philippines” by the People’s Choice Awards for 2013. In 2013, he unsuccessfully ran for vice mayor of Marilao as the running mate of Tito Santiago, the outgoing vice mayor who was eventually elected as mayor.

He was elected to the Bulacan Provincial Board as a member from the 4th district in 2016. He was then re-elected in 2019. He ran for vice governor of Bulacan in 2022 as the running mate of incumbent governor Daniel Fernando and they both won.

Contestant at Are You The Next Big Star?
Castro contested Are You the Next Big Star? on GMA Network in 2009. He advanced to the final round alongside Camille Cortez, Geoff Taylor, and Frencheska Farr, who would eventually won the contest.

Performances/results

Filmography

Television

Film

Personal life
Castro is married to former SexBomb Girls dancer Sunshine Garcia since March 2019 almost two years after their engagement. He has two sons.

References

External links
 

1985 births
Living people
21st-century Filipino male singers
Filipino male television actors
Filipino male models
Far Eastern University alumni
National Unity Party (Philippines) politicians
Star Magic
ABS-CBN personalities
Participants in Philippine reality television series
Male actors from Bulacan
Singers from Bulacan
Members of the Bulacan Provincial Board
Filipino male film actors
Filipino actor-politicians